Helluomorphoides latitarsis is a species of flat-horned ground beetle in the family Carabidae. It is found in North America.

References

Further reading

External links 

 

Harpalinae
Articles created by Qbugbot
Beetles described in 1913